The Wynoochee Dam is  north of Montesano, Washington.  It is owned by the city of Aberdeen, Washington, and was built by the United States Army Corps of Engineers in 1972.  The dam regulates the flow of the Wynoochee River, creating Wynoochee Reservoir. The Wynoochee Lake Shore Trail, designated a National Recreation Trail in 1979, runs  around the lake.

Tacoma Power added a 13MW hydroelectric generating plant downstream from the dam in 1994.  Although access to the dam has been restricted since September 11, 2001, tours are available by appointment.

Coho Campground, managed by the Olympic National Forest, is upstream from the dam.  The campground has running water, restrooms, has a day use area, with cooking pits.  There are 46 sites in the campground with fire pits and picnic tables, room for tents, trailers, motor homes, and these sites are charged a fee.  There is also a boat ramp.  There is a camp host there almost every day.

Tacoma Power operates a day use picnic and swimming area along the shore of the reservoir closest to the dam.

Approximately 16 miles of the Upper Wynoochee Valley Road (Forest Service Development Rd 22) has been paved including the access road for the Wynoochee dam and recreational areas, this includes the Coho camp ground. This allows much faster traveling to and from the dam from Hwy 12 and the city of Montesano. The Donkey Creek Road (also Forest Service Development Rd 22) from Hwy 101 to the dam is currently paved from Highway 101 into the National Forest approximately 7 miles, and gravel the remainder of the way to the junction of FS2294.

References

External links

Tacoma Power's Wynoochee River Project
U.S. Army Corps of Engineers
U.S. Army Corps of Engineers foundation report
Coho Campground details

Dams in Washington (state)
Buildings and structures in Grays Harbor County, Washington
Hydroelectric power plants in Washington (state)
Olympic National Forest
United States Army Corps of Engineers dams
Dams completed in 1972
Energy infrastructure completed in 1972
1972 establishments in Washington (state)
Tacoma Public Utilities